Lloyd Evans (born 14 September 1990) is a Welsh rugby union player who plays for Ospreys regional team as a flanker. He has recently signed a central contract with Wales 7s playing on the HSBC World Series.

Evans made his debut for the Ospreys regional team in 2013 having previously played for the Bridgend Athletic and Bridgend Ravens.

References

External links 
Ospreys Player Profile

Rugby union players from Bridgend
Welsh rugby union players
Ospreys (rugby union) players
Living people
1990 births
Rugby union flankers